Leslie Arnold "Bubba" Thompson (born June 9, 1998) is an American professional baseball outfielder for the Texas Rangers of Major League Baseball (MLB). Thompson was drafted by the Texas Rangers with the 26th overall pick in the first round of the 2017 Major League Baseball draft. He made his MLB debut in 2022.

Amateur career
Thompson attended McGill–Toolen Catholic High School in Mobile, Alabama. He played baseball and American football in high school. As a junior in baseball, he hit .469 with 19 stolen bases. During his senior year in football, he led his team to the Class 7A state title game, and passed for 3,173 yards and 38 touchdowns. Thompson was teammates with future NFL wide receiver Jalen Tolbert.

He originally committed to Auburn University to play college baseball, but changed his commitment to the University of Alabama in February 2017. A three-star football recruit, he also received offers to play college football from the University of Tennessee and the University of Mississippi.

Thompson was considered one of the top prospects for the 2017 Major League Baseball draft. Thompson was drafted by the Texas Rangers with the 26th overall pick in the first round of the draft.

Professional career
Thompson officially signed with the Rangers a few days after the draft and was assigned to the AZL Rangers, where he spent the whole season, posting a .257 batting average in 113 at bats with three home runs and 12 RBIs in thirty games. He spent 2018 with the Hickory Crawdads of the Class A South Atlantic League, where he slashed .289/.344/.446 in 332 at bats with eight home runs, 42 RBIs, and 32 stolen bases in 39 attempts.

Thompson was ranked as the #48 overall prospect in baseball by Baseball Prospectus in their preseason 2019 Top 101 list. He was ranked as the #108 overall prospect in baseball by Fangraphs in their preseason 2019 Top 130 list.

Thompson was assigned to the Down East Wood Ducks of the Class A-Advanced Carolina League for the 2019 season. He was placed on the injured list on April 17, after suffering a fractured hamate bone in his left hand. He finished an injury-marred season hitting .178/.261/.312/.573 in 202 at bats with five home runs and 21 RBIs and 12 steals in 15 attempts in 57 games. Thompson played in the Arizona Fall League for the Surprise Saguaros following the 2019 season, and was named a Fall League All-Star. 

Thompson did not play in 2020 due to the cancellation of the Minor League Baseball season due to the COVID-19 pandemic. Thompson spent the 2021 season with the Frisco RoughRiders of the Double-A Central, hitting .275/.325/.483 in 429 at bats with 16 home runs, 52 RBIs, and 25 stolen bases in 33 attempts. He was named the co-winner of the Rangers' 2021 True Ranger Award, along with Keyber Rodriguez. Thompson opened the 2022 season with the Round Rock Express of the Triple-A Pacific Coast League, hitting .304/.355/.474 in 346 at bats with 13 home runs, 48 RBIs, and 49 stolen bases (a Round Rock record, and second in the PCL) in 52 attempts over 80 games. 

On August 4, 2022, Texas selected Thompson's contract and promoted him to the active roster to make his MLB debut versus the Chicago White Sox. In his debut, Thompson recorded his first career hit, a bunt single off of Johnny Cueto. 

In 2022 with Texas, he batted .265/.302/.312 in 170 at bats with 18 steals in 21 attempts, and his 85.71% stolen base percentage was 8th-best in the American League, as he played primarily left field. He had the second-fastest sprint speed of all major league batters, at 30.4 feet/second.

References

External links

1998 births
Living people
African-American baseball players
Baseball players from Jacksonville, Florida
Sportspeople from Mobile, Alabama
Baseball players from Alabama
Major League Baseball outfielders
Texas Rangers players
Arizona League Rangers players
Hickory Crawdads players
Down East Wood Ducks players
Frisco RoughRiders players
Surprise Saguaros players
Round Rock Express players
21st-century African-American sportspeople